Slovan is a census-designated place in Smith Township, Washington County, Pennsylvania.  As of the 2010 census the population was 555 residents.

References

Census-designated places in Washington County, Pennsylvania
Census-designated places in Pennsylvania